Alphonso D'Abruzzo may refer to:

Robert Alda, American actor, whose birth name was Alphonso Giuseppe Giovanni Roberto D'Abruzzo
Alan Alda, American actor, whose birth name was Alphonso Joseph D'Abruzzo; son of the Alphonso Giuseppe Giovanni Roberto D'Abruzzo (above)